Gyles Daubeney Brandreth (born 8 March 1948) is an English broadcaster, writer and former politician. He has worked as a television presenter, theatre producer, journalist, author and publisher.

He was a presenter for TV-am's Good Morning Britain in the 1980s, and has been regularly featured on Channel 4's game show  Countdown and the BBC's The One Show. On radio, he makes frequent appearances on the BBC Radio 4 programme Just a Minute.

In 1992, Brandreth was elected to the House of Commons as the Conservative Member of Parliament (MP) for the City of Chester constituency. He served until he was defeated in 1997, and resumed his career in the media. He has written both fiction and non-fiction books, and makes appearances as a public speaker.

Early life
Brandreth was born on 8 March 1948 in Wuppertal, West Germany, where his father, Charles Brandreth, was serving as a legal officer with the Allied Control Commission. He moved to London with his parents at the age of three and was educated at the Lycée Français in South Kensington, and Bedales School in Petersfield, Hampshire, where he met his friend Simon Cadell.

Brandreth studied Modern History and Modern Languages at New College, Oxford, where he met Rick Stein. While at Oxford, he directed the Oxford University Dramatic Society and was President of the Oxford Union in Michaelmas term, 1969, and was a regular contributor to the university magazine Isis. He was described in a contemporaneous publication as "Oxford's Lord High Everything Else". Christopher Hitchens suggested that Brandreth "set out to make himself into a Ken Tynan. Wore a cloak."

Television
Brandreth has appeared in the Dictionary Corner on the game show Countdown more than 300 times, including Carol Vorderman's final edition in 2008, making more appearances than any other guest. He appeared on TV-am's Good Morning Britain. He was known for his collection of jumpers, of which some were sold in a charity auction in 1993.

Brandreth hosted the short-lived game show Public Opinion in 2004. In 2006 he appeared on the television series That Mitchell and Webb Look, on the fictional game show "Numberwang", satirising his appearances in Countdowns Dictionary Corner. In 2007 he guest-starred in the Doctor Who audio play I.D.. From July to August 2009 he hosted the game show Knowitalls on BBC Two. In April 2010 he appeared on BBC Radio 4's Vote Now Show. He made a cameo appearance as himself in Channel 4 sitcom The IT Crowd, in the episode "The Final Countdown".

A frequent guest on BBC television panel shows, he has appeared on six episodes of QI and six episodes of Have I Got News for You. He has appeared in episodes of Channel 5's The Gadget Show, and is a contributor to the BBC's early evening programme The One Show. 

He appeared on Room 101 in 2005, while Paul Merton was host, successfully banishing the Royal Variety Performance and the British honours system into Room 101, saying that he would never accept an honour himself. In 2013 he clarified that position, stating that he had "no fundamental objection to the honours system", and that he selected the honours system for Room 101 because he could "tell funny stories about it".

In October 2019, Brandreth appeared in series 3 of Richard Osman's House of Games, winning two of the five episodes.

Also in 2019, Brandreth appeared on series 1 of Celebrity Gogglebox alongside Sheila Hancock. In 2020, Brandreth returned for Series 2, alongside Maureen Lipman. In 2022, he appeared in the series with Joanna Lumley and Carol Vorderman.

In 2020, Brandreth and actor Sheila Hancock replaced Timothy West and Prunella Scales in a two-episode series of Great Canal Journeys, travelling down the River Thames. In the first episode Timothy West gave the two novice canal boaters a crash course in barging. They went down the Staffordshire Waterways in 2021 for another two-episode series.

On 16 October 2021, Brandreth appeared as a celebrity contestant on Beat the Chasers in aid of Great Ormond Street Hospital.

On 24 October 2022, Brandreth appeared on Bargain Hunt: BBC 100th Birthday Special to commemorate the BBC's 100th Anniversary. His team mate was Tony Blackburn.

Radio

Brandreth has presented programmes on London's LBC radio at various times since 1973, such as Star Quality. He frequently appears on BBC Radio 4's comedy panel game Just a Minute. He has appeared on several episodes of Radio 4's political programme The Westminster Hour, explaining his thoughts on how to make the most of being a government minister. From 2003 to 2005 Brandreth hosted the Radio 4 comedy panel game Whispers.

In 2006, Brandreth appeared in the Radio 4 comedy programme Living with the Enemy which he co-wrote with comedian Nick Revell, in which they appear as a former Conservative government minister and a former comedian. In 2010 he broadcast a Radio 4 documentary about his great-great-great-grandfather, Benjamin Brandreth, the inventor of a medicine called "Brandreth's Pills". He is the host of the Radio 4 comedy panel show Wordaholics, first aired on 20 February 2012. He appeared on the Radio 4 programme The Museum of Curiosity in August 2017, to which he donated a button that was once owned by a famous actor.

In April 2019, Brandreth began co-hosting a podcast titled Something Rhymes With Purple alongside friend and colleague Susie Dent. The podcast discusses aspects of the English language such as historic or unusual words and their origins, as well as the origins of popular phrases and sayings.

Writing
Since the 1970s, Brandreth has written books for adults and children about Scrabble, words, puzzles and jokes, and co-founded the Games & Puzzles magazine. He wrote an authorised biography of actor John Gielgud, and lipogrammic reworks of Shakespeare. In the 1980s, Brandreth wrote scripts for Dear Ladies, a television programme featuring Hinge and Bracket. Brandreth created the stage show Zipp!, which enjoyed success at the Edinburgh Festival and had a short run in the West End.

In 1999, he published diaries chronicling his days as a politician between 1990 and 1997, called Breaking the Code.

In September 2004, Brandreth's book on the marriage of the Queen and the Duke of Edinburgh, Philip and Elizabeth: Portrait of a Marriage was published. In July 2005, he published a second book on the Royal Family, entitled Charles and Camilla: Portrait of a Love Affair, which concerns the three-decade love affair between Charles, Prince of Wales and Camilla, Duchess of Cornwall.

In 2021, following the death of Prince Philip, Duke of Edinburgh, Brandreth wrote, "The duke showed me great friendliness over 40 years but royalty offer you friendliness, not friendship, and you have to remember the difference.” 

Brandreth has written a series of seven works of historical fiction called The Oscar Wilde Murder Mysteries, in which Oscar Wilde works with both Robert Sherard and Arthur Conan Doyle.

Brandreth has written and toured in a number of comedic one-man shows, including The One-to-One Show in 2010–2011, Looking for Happiness in 2013–2014 and Word Power in 2015–2016.

Brandreth has written a book entitled Have You Eaten Grandma?, about the English language and correct grammar.

Politics
Brandreth was a Conservative MP, representing the City of Chester, from 1992 to 1997. He proposed a private member's bill which became law as the Marriage Act 1994. In 1995, he was appointed to a junior ministerial position as a Lord of the Treasury, with his role being essentially that of a whip.

He broadcast reminiscences of his parliamentary career on BBC radio as Brandreth on Office and The Brandreth Rules in 2001, 2003 and 2005.

In August 2014, Brandreth was one of 200 public figures who were signatories to a letter to The Guardian opposing Scottish independence in the run-up to September's referendum on that issue. In May 2016, Brandreth told The Spectator that he was likely to vote for the UK to stay in the European Union in the following month's referendum on the issue. In 2019, Brandreth confirmed that he had voted to remain, but accepted the result of the referendum and believed that the government had to "get Brexit done".

Other activities

Brandreth is a former European Monopoly champion, and president of the Association of British Scrabble Players, having organised the first British National Scrabble Championship in 1971. Since 2015 he has been the president of the Oscar Wilde Society, which was founded in 1990.

He is an after-dinner speaker and held the world record for the longest continuous after-dinner speech, twelve-and-a-half hours, done as a charity stunt. With his wife, he founded a Teddy bear museum. Located in Stratford-upon-Avon for 18 years, it was relocated to the Polka Theatre in Wimbledon, London. In 2016, the museum moved to Newby Hall in Yorkshire. He is a patron of the National Piers Society and vice-president of charity Fields in Trust (formerly the National Playing Fields Association).

In 2014, Brandreth was awarded the honorary degree of Doctor of Letters (DLitt) from the University of Chester. In December 2016, he was named the university's chancellor, and officially took the role in March 2017.

Personal life
Brandreth met his future wife, Michèle Brown, at Oxford. Five years later, with Brown working as a television reporter and Brandreth in theatre, the couple decided to have a "quiet wedding". They were married at Marylebone Registry Office on 8 June 1973, with actor Simon Cadell, Brandreth's best friend from school, as a witness. The couple have lived in Barnes, southwest London, since 1986. 

They have three children, including Aphra, a former Conservative councillor in Richmond. She is deputy chair of the Conservative Women's Organisation and was the party's unsuccessful candidate for Kingston and Surbiton at the 2019 United Kingdom general election.

Brandreth is a vegetarian, and stopped drinking alcohol in 1997 in order to lose weight.

Selected bibliography

Non-fiction
 Created in Captivity (1972), a study of prison reform
 The Funniest Man on Earth (1974), a biography of Dan Leno
 The Joy of Lex: How to Have Fun with 860,341,500 Words (1980), 
The Complete Home Entertainer (1981) 
 Everyman's Indoor Games (1981), 
 The World's Best Indoor Games (1981), 
871 Famous Last Words, and Put-downs, Insults, Squelches, Compliments, Rejoinders, Epigrams, and Epitaphs of Famous People (1982) 
 The Book of Mistaikes (1982), 
Wordplay (1982), 
John Gielgud: A Celebration (1984) 
 The Scrabble Brand Puzzle Book (1984), 
 The Book of Solo Games (1984), 
 A Guide to Playing the Scrabble Brand Crossword Game (1985), 
 Wit knits: Lively and original hand-knitting designs (1985),  (with George Hostler)
 The Great Book of Optical Illusions (1985), 
 Everyman's Classic Puzzles (1986), 
 The Scrabble Companion (1988),  (with Darryl Francis)
 World Championship Scrabble (1992),  (with Darryl Francis)
 Under the Jumper: Autobiographical Excursions (1993). 
 Breaking the Code: Westminster Diaries, 1992–97 (1999), 
 Brief Encounters: Meetings with Remarkable People (2001), 
 John Gielgud: An Actor's Life (2001), 
 The Biggest Kids Joke Book Ever! (2002), 
 The Joy of Lex: An Amazing and Amusing Z to A and A to Z of Words (2002), 
 The Word Book (2002), 
 Philip and Elizabeth: Portrait of a Marriage (2004), 
 Charles and Camilla: Portrait of a Love Affair (2005), 
 The 7 Secrets of Happiness (2013) 
 Word Play (2015) 
 Messing About in Quotes  (2018) 
 The Oxford Book of Theatrical Anecdotes (2020) 
 Philip: The Final Portrait (2021) 
 Odd Boy Out (2021) 
 Elizabeth: An Intimate Portrait (2022)

Fiction
 Here Comes Golly (1979). 
 Who is Nick Saint? (1996). 
 Venice Midnight (1999). 
 Oscar Wilde and the Candlelight Murders (2007), (American title: Oscar Wilde and a Death of No Importance).  
 Oscar Wilde and the Ring of Death (2008), (American title: Oscar Wilde and a Game Called Murder). 
 Oscar Wilde and the Dead Man's Smile (2009). 
 Oscar Wilde and the Nest of Vipers (2010), (American title: Oscar Wilde and the Vampire Murders).  
 Oscar Wilde and the Vatican Murders (2011).  
 Oscar Wilde and the Murders at Reading Gaol (2012). 
 Jack the Ripper - Case Closed (2017)-  (American title: Oscar Wilde and the Return of Jack the Ripper (2019). )

References

External links

Gyles Brandreth's official website

 
Gyles Brandreth - The Telegraph
Gyles Brandreth | Culture | The Guardian

1948 births
20th-century English male actors
20th-century English male writers
20th-century English non-fiction writers
20th-century English novelists
20th-century diarists
21st-century English male actors
21st-century English male writers
21st-century English non-fiction writers
21st-century English novelists
Alumni of New College, Oxford
British Scrabble players
British broadcaster-politicians
British monarchists
Conservative Party (UK) MPs for English constituencies
English biographers
English diarists
English podcasters
Living people
People associated with the University of Chester
People educated at Bedales School
People educated at Lycée Français Charles de Gaulle
People from Barnes, London
Presidents of the Oxford Union
Television personalities from London
UK MPs 1992–1997
Writers from London